Parlane is a surname of Scottish origin. Notable persons with the surname include:

Brent Parlane, New Zealand-Australian singer
Derek Parlane (born 1953), Scottish footballer
Michael Parlane (born 1972), New Zealand cricketer, brother of Neal
Neal Parlane (born 1978), New Zealand cricketer, brother of Michael
Robert Parlane (1847–1918), Scottish footballer
Rosy Parlane (real name Paul Douglas), New Zealand electronic musician
Tim Parlane (born 1957), New Zealand cricket umpire
William Parlane (1908–1988), Scottish footballer

References

Surnames